Ánimo Inglewood Charter High School is a public charter school in Inglewood, California, operated by Green Dot Public Schools of Los Angeles.

It was the second Green Dot school to be established, due in part to the success of  Ánimo Leadership Charter High School. It opened in August 2002, with 145 new students, adding a new freshman class of 140 every year until 2006, when it reached full capacity to approximately 525 students. Classes began at the First United Methodist Church on the corner of Kelso Street and Spruce  Avenue for three years, until moving to the old Kaiser Permanente hospital on Manchester Boulevard.

So far, seven classes have graduated from Animo Inglewood. The first class graduated in 2006. More than 85% of students from each class graduate and enroll in four-year colleges/universities.

Animo Inglewood is known for its academic rigor and high academic expectations. It has outperformed local high schools, including Inglewood High and Morningside High in the annual API reports, scoring a 775 API during the 2011–12 school year. Freshmen are admitted through a lottery process; about 145 students that apply are accepted to the school, while the remainder are placed on a waiting list.

References

External links
 
 Green Dot Results

Charter high schools in California
Educational institutions established in 2002
Schools in Inglewood, California
2002 establishments in California
Green Dot Public Schools